Pieszków  is a village in the administrative district of Gmina Lubin, within Lubin County, Lower Silesian Voivodeship, in south-western Poland.

The name of the village is of Polish origin and comes from the word pies, which means "dog".

Transport
The S3 highway runs nearby, west of the village.

References

Villages in Lubin County